Johann Krieger (1651–1735) was a German composer and organist.

Johann Krieger or Johan Krieger may also refer to:

Johan Cornelius Krieger (1683–1755), Danish architect
Johann Nepomuk Krieger (1865–1902), German draftsman and selenographer
Johann Philipp Krieger (1649–1725), German composer and organist